She Stoops to Conquer is a 1914 British silent historical comedy film directed by George Loane Tucker and starring Henry Ainley,  Jane Gail and Gregory Scott. It is an adaptation of Oliver Goldsmith's play She Stoops to Conquer.

Cast
 Henry Ainley as Marlow  
 Jane Gail as Kate Hardcastle  
 Gregory Scott as Jeremy  
 Charles Rock as Hardcastle  
 Wyndham Guise as Tony Lumpkin  
 Christine Rayner as Constance Neville  
 Gerald Ames as Hastings  
 Lewis Gilbert as Sir Charles Marlow  
 Stella St. Audrie as Mrs. Hardcastle  
 Nelson Ramsey as Landlord  
 Fay Compton as Barmaid

References

Bibliography
 Goble, Alan. The Complete Index to Literary Sources in Film. Walter de Gruyter, 1999.

External links
 

1914 films
1910s historical comedy films
British historical comedy films
British silent short films
Films set in England
Films directed by George Loane Tucker
British black-and-white films
1914 short films
1910s English-language films
1910s British films
Silent historical comedy films